Jora Bangla Temple is the oldest temple of Madaripur district. This temple is located in Khalia village of Rajair upazila, Madaripur, Bangladesh. It was built in the seventeenth century by the Khaliar distinguished Hindu landlord Rajaram Rai. The front of the temple is covered with terracotta crafts and the scenes of the Ramayana-Mahabharata.

References 

Hindu temples in Dhaka Division
Madaripur District